Move to Heaven is a South Korean streaming television series directed by Kim Sung-ho and written by Yoon Ji-ryeon. It is an original Netflix series, starring Lee Je-hoon, Tang Jun-sang, and Hong Seung-hee. The series follows Geu-ru (Tang Joon-sang), a young man with autism, and Sang-gu (Lee Je-hoon), his guardian. Working as trauma cleaners, they uncover untold stories. The series was released worldwide by Netflix on May 14, 2021.

Synopsis
Geu-ru (Tang Jun-sang), who has Asperger syndrome, and his ex-convict uncle Sang-gu (Lee Je-hoon) meet for the first time after the sudden death of Geu-ru's father. Entrusted as Geu-ru's guardian, Sang-gu joins his nephew to help run the family trauma cleaning company "Move to Heaven", where in the course of business they uncover untold stories about the deceased while Sang-gu tries to deal with his painful past with Geu-ru's father as well as the traumatic incident that landed him in jail.

Inspiration
Move to Heaven is inspired by the essay "Things Left Behind" by Kim Sae-byul, a former "trauma cleaner".

Cast

Main
 Lee Je-hoon as Cho Sang-gu, an ex-convict and Geu-ru's estranged uncle who becomes his guardian upon release from jail. He is blunt, smokes cigarettes, and moonlights as an underground MMA fighter. He was sent to jail after putting his protégé Su-cheol into a coma during a fight. Despite his background, he is still entrusted to take care of Geu-ru after his release, and is instructed stay and work with Geu-ru for a three-month probationary period. Although he initially does so for financial gain and appears to be ignorant of Geu-ru's condition, he slowly gets to know Geu-ru as they both work together as trauma cleaners for Move to Heaven, gaining a new outlook on life and allowing him to discover the truth about his half-brother and Geu-ru's father Jeong-woo, who had abandoned him when he was still very young.
 Tang Jun-sang as Han Geu-ru, a 20-year-old with autism spectrum disorder who works as a trauma cleaner for Move to Heaven, over which he took following his father's death. He is highly intelligent and extremely logical, and has an incredible memory, which allows him to uncover untold stories about the deceased through the collection of their important personal belongings. Following his father's practise, Geu-ru places the deceased's most important belongings in a yellow box, which he always insists on handing over to the next of kin; if they cannot be readily found or are unwilling to receive the box, Geu-ru always tries to find a way to pass it on regardless, often to Sang-gu's consternation. Geu-ru also has a minor obsession with fish and marine life, since his parents regularly brought him to a giant aquarium as a child, and he continues to do so as an adult. When he feels panicked, Geu-ru recites facts about fish in order to calm himself. Despite his condition, there are a lot of people surrounding him who understand his situation and try their best to help him and comfort him.
 Hong Seung-hee as Yoon Na-mu, Geu-ru's best friend and neighbour who joins and helps him run Move to Heaven after she becomes suspicious of Sang-gu's sudden presence in Geu-ru's life. However, her mother disapproves of her working as a trauma cleaner, so she does so in secret. She has been fond and protective of Geu-ru since they first met when they were kids and is willing to take good care of him.

Supporting
 Ji Jin-hee as Han Jeong-woo, Geu-ru's father and Sang-gu's older half-brother from the same mother. He was the founder and owner of Move to Heaven before his sudden death from cardiac arrest. Previously a firefighter in Busan, he rescued an abandoned infant, whom he and his wife later adopted and named Geu-ru. After her passing, he taught Geu-ru everything about life and his job as a trauma cleaner, but kept his heart condition secret from him. He also treated Sang-gu like his own brother, but after Sang-gu's father died and Jeong-woo inadvertently abandoned him, they became estranged until Su-cheol tried to reunite them at his last fight. Although Sang-gu refuses to see him when he tries to visit him in jail, Jeong-woo still entrusts his son's future care with him.
  as Min Ji-won, Jeong-woo's wife and Geu-ru's mother, who died from cancer when he was a child.
 Lee Moon-sik as Park Joo-taek, a waste disposal truck driver and a friend of Jeong-woo. He is a close partner of Move to Heaven who helps them collect the unusuable garbage left by the deceased. A North Korean defector, he is amazed by Move to Heaven's work and always prioritized them when they need his service.
 Im Won-hee as Oh Hyun-chang, a lawyer and a partner of Move to Heaven. He was assigned by Jeong-woo to contact Sang-gu when he got discharged from prison and explains to Geu-ru and Na-mu the guardianship arrangement with Sang-gu.
 Hongseok as Park Jun-yeong, a policeman and friend of Han Geu-ru and Yoon Na-mu. He is usually seen attending crime scenes where clean up by Move to Heaven is required, and is their first contact when the pair needs the help of the police. Like Na-mu, he understands Geu-ru's condition and tries his best to help him. It is hinted that he has feelings toward Yoon Na-mu.
 Jung Young-joo as Oh Mi-ran, Na-mu's mother. She runs a small takeaway shop, located against Move to Heaven, with her husband. She disapproves of both her daughter's friendship with Geu-ru and her working for Move to Heaven.
 Lee Jae-wook as Kim Su-cheol, Sang-gu's friend and protégé. 10 years ago, Sang-gu helped him out when he was beaten up by street thugs, inspiring Su-cheol to become a fighter and eventually becoming a champion boxer himself. After several years, he told Sang-gu that he wanted to retire from boxing so he could start a new life running a supply shop with his father and sister. He willingly participated in a rigged underground MMA fight against Sang-gu in order to get the money he needed. During the fight, after Su-cheol refused to concede, Sang-gu violently knocked him out, putting him into coma, and Sang-gu was sent to jail for it. Sang-gu visits a still-comatose Su-cheol in hospital after his release, but he passes away soon after. Sang-gu later discovers Su-cheol was suffering from CTE, which was his real reason for retirement.
 Park Jung-won as Kim Su-jin, Su-cheol's younger sister.
 Jung Ae-youn as Madam Jung, an associate of Sang-gu and an underground MMA fight organizer. She organized the fight between him and Su-cheol and, after his release from jail, persuades Sang-gu to continue fighting for her.
 Choi Soo-young as Son Woo-rim, a social worker who helps lonely citizens who don't have any other family. She first crosses paths with Move to Heaven when they attend to the home of an elderly couple who have committed suicide together, and later contacts them to take care of Matthew Green's belongings. Sang-gu appears to have a crush on her.

Guest appearances
 Shin Soo-oh as Kim Yong-woo, a murder suspect. (Episode 4)
 Yoon Ji-hye as Lee Ju-yeong, a public prosecutor. (Episodes 4 and 10)
 Kwon Soo-hyun as Soo-hyun, a doctor. (Episode 5)
 Lee Ki-young as Soo-hyun's father, a decorated military officer. (Episode 5)
 Jung Dong-hwan as Kim In-su, an elderly man who commits suicide alongside his wife. (Episode 6)
 Yoon Joo-sang as Chairman No. (Episode 6)
 Yoo Sun as Kang Eun-jeong, a newscaster. When she was a teenager, her parents fostered Korean children who were to be adopted by overseas couples. (Episode 9)  
 Kevin Oh as Matthew Green, a deportee from the United States looking for his birth mother, whom he believes to be Kang Eun-jeong. His birth name is Kang Seong-min. (Episode 9)
 Lee Re as "butterfly girl". (Episode 10)

Production

Development
In September 2019, it was reported that Kim Sung-ho would direct a series for Netflix, the story of which is inspired by an essay "Things Left Behind" by Kim Sae-byul, a former "trauma cleaner".

Casting
On 17 December 2019, Netflix confirmed the lead casting of Lee Je-hoon and Tang Jun-sang for the series.  On June 3, 2020, Netflix confirmed that Ji Jin-hee, Lee Jae-wook and Hong Seung-hee are to join the cast of the series.

Filming
As the infection due to COVID-19 pandemic was reported, the production of Move to Heaven, along with other Netflix original dramas, was stopped in late August 2020. On February 25, 2021 Netflix announced its future plans and time line for forthcoming projects including Move to Heaven. On February 25, 2021, new stills from the TV series were released.

Episodes

Release

The series was released on Netflix on May 14, 2021. All 10 episodes, each with running time of around 45 to 60 minutes, are available for streaming. It became 11th South Korean Netflix original series released on Netflix.

Reception
Greg Wheeler of The Review Geek, rating the series 9 out of 10, opined that the series is a beautiful message conveyed through unique characters. Wheeler praised the performance of Tang Jun-sang, writing "Tang Joon-Sang’s acting is nothing short of extraordinary..." He also praised the soundtrack and wrote that it was "absolutely on-point." In summary he said, "With excellent acting, tightly written chapters and a careful, respectful and empowering view on death, Move to Heaven is a cleverly written and unique Korean drama", and concluded by saying that the show was an "...absolute must-watch this year. Just be sure to have a pack of tissues ready to catch those tears!". Rhian Daly of NME also praised the series, awarding it 5 out of 5 stars and called it a contender for one of 2021's best shows.

Awards and nominations

Rankings

References

External links
 
 
 
 Move to Heaven at Daum 

Korean-language Netflix original programming
2021 South Korean television series debuts
Autism in television
Television series about orphans
Television productions suspended due to the COVID-19 pandemic